The Venetia Diamond Mine is South Africa's largest producer of diamonds, since 1995. It is situated close to the South African town of Alldays in the Limpopo province and is located within the 360 km² Venetia Limpopo Nature Reserve.

The open cast mine is one of De Beers’ six remaining diamond mines in South Africa and the only major diamond mine to be developed in the country during the past 25 years. As such, the mine represents one of De Beers’ single biggest investments in South Africa. The mine was opened in 1992 by Harry Oppenheimer, a former De Beers chairman.

In 2004 the mine had 955 employees and recovered 7,187,300 carats (1437.5 kg) of diamonds from 5,871,000 metric tons of ore.In 2021 the mine will cease its opencast operation and move towards underground mining extending the life of the mine by a further 21 years up to 2044.

The Kolope River flows 8 km to the west of the mine. Surface water storage dams have been built on two of its tributaries.

References

External links
Sustaining Water Supplies While Responding to Operational Requirements at De Beers Venetia Mine
Effect of Small Catchment Dams on Downstream Vegetation of a Seasonal River in semi-arid African Savanna

Diamond mines in South Africa
Surface mines in South Africa
Geography of Limpopo
Economy of Limpopo